Roger Blackwell, Ph.D., is an American marketing expert and public speaker.  He was described in the New York Times as one of America's top speakers on business and marketing, along with Daniel Burrus and Tom Peters. He has served on the board of directors for multiple companies, most prominently Max & Erma's Restaurant, Inc., Abercrombie & Fitch, and Worthington Foods. Blackwell was a long-time marketing professor at Ohio State University, and has also taught at Stanford University, Cape Town University in South Africa, and Guelph University in Canada.  Prior to his retirement, Sales and Marketing Executives International named him Outstanding Marketing Professor in America. He is known for his model of the consumer decision-making process.

Blackwell has published more than twenty-five books and research reports. His most notable publications include Consumer Behavior, 10th edition (he is a co-author), a textbook used in several languages internationally. He also wrote Brands That Rock on the interaction of rock and roll and branding strategy, From Mind to Market, which discusses transforming supply chains into demand chains, Customers Rule!, which contains suggestions and solutions for online businesses, and From the Edge of the World on global marketing strategies.  He published a major report with Dr. Tom Williams, Consumer Driven Health Care, describing how to use HSAs to reduce health care costs, and has published over 100 articles in multiple scholarly and trade journals.

In 1999, Worthington Foods, on whose board Blackwell served, discussed a possible merger with the Kellogg Company.  During the time the merger was discussed, the stock price of Worthington dropped to half its eventual sale price and 6,000 people bought shares, including hundreds of associates of Worthington directors and employees.  Two included an employee of Roger’s consulting firm and her husband, who bought additional shares in the IRA accounts.  Roger and the Two employees were convicted of insider trading. Blackwell received a six-year prison sentence and a fine of one million dollars.  Blackwell maintains his innocence, believing his policy of not commenting about board meetings was the appropriate response to people who asked about the company.  Today, Blackwell is a frequent speaker to corporate seminars and university classes on behavioral economics, marketing and ethics.

Notes

External links
Worthington Foods
Columbus Dispatch Article
Kellogg Company

Ohio State University faculty
Marketing speakers
Living people
Year of birth missing (living people)